San Vittore is a municipality in the Moesa Region in the Swiss canton of Grisons (Graubünden).

Geography

Of this area, 15.5% is used for agricultural purposes, while 66.7% is forested. Of the rest of the land, 2.8% is settled (buildings or roads) and the remainder (15%) is non-productive (rivers, glaciers or mountains).

Demographics
, 14.2% of the population was made up of foreign nationals. Over the last 10 years the population has grown at a rate of 16.2%. Most of the population speaks Italian (88.7%), with German being second most common ( 7.6%) and French being third ( 1.1%).

, the gender distribution of the population was 50.6% male and 49.4% female.  The age distribution, in San Vittore is; 82 children or 12.5% of the population are between 0 and 9 years old.  32 teenagers or 4.9% are 10 to 14, and 24 teenagers or 3.7% are 15 to 19.  Of the adult population, 54 people or 8.2% of the population are between 20 and 29 years old.  126 people or 19.2% are 30 to 39, 117 people or 17.8% are 40 to 49, and 72 people or 11.0% are 50 to 59.  The senior population distribution is 81 people or 12.3% of the population are between 60 and 69 years old, 40 people or 6.1% are 70 to 79, there are 25 people or 3.8% who are 80 to 89, and there are 4 people or 0.6% who are 90 to 99.

In the 2007 federal election the most popular party was the SP which received 36.9% of the vote.  The next three most popular parties were the SVP (29.3%), the CVP (16.7%) and the FDP (15.6%).

In San Vittore about 73.5% of the population (between age 25-64) have completed either non-mandatory upper secondary education or additional higher education (either university or a Fachhochschule).

San Vittore has an unemployment rate of 2.06%.  , there were 23 people employed in the primary economic sector and about 10 businesses involved in this sector.  129 people are employed in the secondary sector and there are 13 businesses in this sector.  68 people are employed in the tertiary sector, with 23 businesses in this sector.

The historical population is given in the following table:

Heritage sites of national significance

The Chapel of S. Lucio e dintorni and the Torre di Pala are listed as Swiss heritage sites of national significance.

References

External links

 Official website 
 

 
Municipalities of Graubünden
Cultural property of national significance in Graubünden